Hoje É o Primeiro Dia do Resto da Sua Vida (Portuguese for "Today is the first day of the rest of your life") is the second solo record by Brazilian singer Rita Lee. Originally intended to be released as an album by Os Mutantes, due to conflicts with the band's record label it was released as a Rita Lee solo effort. The album marks the last time Lee would work with the Baptista brothers before her exit from Mutantes. In a matter of fact, the album was a product of a proper Os Mutantes creative process. The record company Polydor, declined to publish two Mutantes album within one year (the former was Mutantes e Seus Cometas no País do Baurets). The band decided to exclusively give Ms. Lee the vocal role, and publish the album under her name.

Due to its scarcity, original pressings of the album have been known to sell for upwards of $1,000.

Track listing

Personnel
Os Mutantes
 Arnaldo Baptista: Vox organ, Minimoog, piano, Hohner clavinet, vocals
 Rita Lee: lead vocals
 Sérgio Dias: guitars, vocals
 Liminha: bass guitar, backing vocals
 Dinho Leme: drums

Special guests:
 Lúcia Turnbull - vocals 
 Cláudio Cesar Dias Baptista - voice in "Hoje É o Primeiro Dia do Resto da Sua Vida" and "Superfície do Planeta"

References

1972 albums
Rita Lee albums